Porkka is a Finnish surname. Notable people with the surname include:

Henrik Porkka (born 1998), Finnish volleyball player
Toni Porkka (born 1970), Finnish ice hockey player

Finnish-language surnames